Solanum virginianum, also called Surattense nightshade, yellow-fruit nightshade, yellow-berried nightshade, Indian nightshade, Thai green eggplant, or Thai striped eggplant (from the unripe fruit), is a medicinal plant used mostly in India. Some parts of the plant, like the fruit, are poisonous.  The common name is Kantakari. Solanum surattense Burm. f. and Solanum xanthocarpum Schrad. and Wendl. are synonyms of Solanum virginianum L. (Sharma et al., 2010).

Description

Plant body

Thorny Nightshade is an erect herb, sometimes woody at the base, 50–70cm tall, and copiously armed with sturdy, needlelike, and broad-based prickles measuring 0.5–2cm × 0.5–1.5mm.

Leaves

The plant has ovate-oblong, sinuated leaves that are unequally paired, the blades measuring 4-9 × 2-4.5cm. They have an acute apex and unequal lobes and are either pinnate or possessive of usually 5-9 lobes. The veins and stalks of the leaves are prickly, the stalks having a length of 2-3.5cm.

Inflorescence

The racemose inflorescence of the plant is 4–7cm tall. The sepal tube is bell-shaped with a diameter of 1cm.

Flowers

Its blue-purple flowers are 1.4–1.6 × 2.5cm. The petals are ovate-deltate, measuring 6–8mm, and are densely pubescent with stellate hairs. The filaments have a measurement of 1mm, the anthers 8mm, and the style 1cm.

Fruits

Fruiting pedicels of the yellow-fruit nightshade have prickles and sparse stellate hairs and are 2–3.6cm tall. The fruiting sepals are prickly and sparsely pubescent. Pale yellow berries of 1.3–2.2 cm in diameter are produced. The ripe yellow fruits are around 3 cm in diameter. Flowering normally appears around November to May.

Occurrence

This plant is cultivated in Himalayas, South-East Malaysia, Australia, and Polynesia region. The plant is commonly found in India, often in waste places, on roadsides and in open space.

Medicine
The plant has many medicinal properties. In the tribes of Nilgiris, the plant is used to treat whitlow (finger abscess) by inserting the affected finger into a ripe fruit for a few minutes. In Nepal, a decoction of the root is taken twice a day for seven days to treat cough, asthma, and chest pain.

Ayurvedic physicians commonly used the drugs of Dashmula in their private practices. Dashmula consists of the roots of five trees (brihat panchmula) and the roots of five small herbs (laghu panchmula). A deep study in Ayurveda indicates that out of 33 species of Solanum from the Solanaceae family, two species are used in “Dashmula,” namely Solanum anguivi Lam. (Bruhati) and Solanum virginianum L. (Kantkari) (Sharma, 2006). The tribes and villagers also used the drugs of the Dashmula group for their common illnesses. It is estimated that about 8000 metric tons of the roots used in Dashmula are used annually by Ayurvedic industry in Maharashtra.

Heble et al. (1968) discovered chemically isolated, crystallized diosgenin and beta cytosterol constituents from Solanum virginianum L. Further, they reported the presence of triterpenes like Tupeol. Heble et al., (1971) noted the presence of coumarins, scopolin, scopoletin, esculin, and esculetin from plant parts of Solanum virginianum through column chromatography. In addition to alkaloid content, Hussain et al. (2010) also determined the presence of flavonoids and saponin apart from the presence of tolerable levels of heavy metals like Cu, Fe, Pb, Cd, and Zn. Shankaret al. (2011) reported and quantified bioactive steroidal glycoalkaloid khasianine in addition to solanine and solasomargine through HPTLC. Apigenin was antiallergic, while diosgenin exhibited anti-inflammatory effects (Singh et al., 2010). The leaf extract inhibits the growth of pathogenic organisms. (Seeba, 2009). Tanusak Changbanjong et al. (2010) reported the effect of the crude extract of Solanum virginianum against snails and mosquito larvae.

Solanum virginianum L. (Kantkari) is useful in the treatment of bronchial asthma (Govindan et al., 1999). Krayer and Briggs (1950) reported the antiaccelerator cardiac action of solasodine and some of its derivatives. The plant possesses antiurolithiatic and natriuretic activities. (Patel et al., 2010). A decoction of the fruit of the plant is used for the treatment of diabetes (Nadkarni, 1954). Solanum virginianum L. is useful for treating cough, chest pain, vomiting, hair fall, leprosy, itching scabies, skin diseases and cardiac diseases associated with edema (Kumar et al., 2010).

A decoction of the root has diuretic and expectorant properties and is used in the treatment of catarrhal, fever, cough, asthma, and chest pain (Ghani, 1996). A root paste is utilized by the Mukundara tribes of Rajasthan for the treatment of hernia, as well as flatulence and constipation. The stem, flowers and fruits are prescribed for relief of burning sensations in the feet. Leaves are applied locally to relieve body or muscle pains, while its juice mixed with black pepper is advised for rheumatism (Nadkarni, 1954). The fruit juice is useful for sore throats and rheumatism. A decoction of the fruit of the plant is used by tribal and rural people of Orissa for the treatment of diabetes (Nadkarni, 1954). Smoking the seeds of the dried solanum virginianum in a biri wrap is said to allay toothache and tooth decay in Indian folk medicine.

In-vitro antioxidant and in-vivo antimutagenic properties of Solanum xanthocarpum seed extracts have been examined by qualitative phytochemical screening, which reveals the presence of polyphenols, flavonoids, glycoside, alkaloids, carbohydrates, and reducing sugar in the plant. Based on preliminary qualitative phytochemical screening, quantitative estimation of polyphenols in the plant has also been performed. The quantitative estimation of alcoholic extracts found significant amounts of polyphenols, as compared to aqueous extracts. In-vitro antioxidant studies has been performed by two methods: DDPH, and a superoxide radical scavenging method. The alcoholic extracts showed significant antioxidant properties, as compared to aqueous extracts. Based on polyphenols and antioxidant properties, alcoholic extracts were used for the antimutagenic (clastogenic) test. The alcoholic extracts produced significant results regarding antimutagenic activity.

Gallery

See also

Asian eggplants:
Thai eggplant, common cultivar types in Thailand are 'Thai Purple', 'Thai Green', 'Thai Yellow', and 'Thai White' (cultivars of Solanum melongena).
Lao eggplant for common cultivar types in Laos such as 'Lao Green Stripe', 'Lao Purple Stripe', 'Lao Lavender', and 'Lao White' (cultivars of Solanum melongena).
African eggplant, gboma, or gboma eggplant (Solanum macrocarpon): Cà pháo is used too in Vietnamese cuisine (Vietnamese eggplant?)

Note

References

https://clinphytoscience.springeropen.com/articles/10.1186/s40816-020-00229-1

External links

Medicinal plants of Asia
virginianum